Shelokhovskaya is a rural locality (a village) and the administrative center of Priozernoye Rural Settlement of Kargopolsky District, Arkhangelsk Oblast, Russia. The population was 521 as of 2010. There are 20 streets.

Geography 
Shelokhovskaya is located 54 km north of Kargopol (the district's administrative centre) by road. Nikulinskaya is the nearest rural locality.

References 

Rural localities in Kargopolsky District